Douglas Bennett Cockerell (1870 – 1945) was a British bookbinder and author.

Early life and education 
Douglas Bennett Cockerell was born on 5 August 1870 in Clifton Cottage, Sydenham in London, England to parents Alice Elizabeth and Sydney John Cockerell. They were a middle class family but when his father died in 1877, the family struggled. He attended the St. Paul’s School, until age 15 when he moved to Canada. Cockerell wasn't doing well in school and Canada gave him new opportunities, initially he worked on a farm. At the age of 20, he ended up managing a bank at Portage la Prairie, Manitoba.

Cockerell returned to England in 1891 and worked as a secretary of the Chiswick School of Arts and Crafts in west London. His older brother, Sydney Carlyle Cockerell was a secretary to William Morris of the Kelmscott Press, this introduced him to book arts. Cockerell apprenticed under T.J. Cobden-Sanderson from 1893 until 1897 at the Doves Bindery in Hammersmith, London, where he learned to bind new books and make book repairs.

Career 
After he completed his apprenticeship, in 1897 he opened his own bindery at 6 Denmark Street, off Charing Cross Road in London and started teaching at the London County Council Central School of Arts and Crafts (now known as Central School of Art and Design). When he was not able to find teaching resources, Cockerell wrote his own instructional book, Bookbinding and the Care of Books (1901). He taught at Central School of Art and Design from 1897 until 1905, and then again until 1935 from 1921. He also taught at the Royal College of Art.
Douglas’s most celebrated pupil/employee and partner was Roger Powell who founded his own bindery in Froxfield Hampshire. Roger rebound The Book of Kells in Dublin in 1953. 
Students of Cockerell included his son Sydney Morris Cockerell, Polly Lada-Mocarski, Elizabeth Greenhill, and others. The founders of the Sangorski & Sutcliffe bookbinder firm met in a Cockerell course at Central School of Art and Design.

Cockerell continued to teach, he did experiments with binding and materials, documented his knowledge in authored books, as well as take new bindery jobs for art books.

In 1936, he received “Designer for Industry of the Royal Society of Arts”.

Douglas Cockerell died at his home, 298 Norton Way South, Letchworth, on 25 November 1945.  Sydney "Sandy" Morris Cockerell his son, carried on the work at the bindery after his death, as well as Roger Powell, who had worked there from 1935 to 1947. The bindery closed down in 1987, after Sandy's death.

Publications

References 

1870 births
1945 deaths
People from Sydenham, London
Bookbinders
Book artists
Academics of the Royal College of Art